Leonard Filgate (born August 26, 1947) is an artist and illustrator, best known for the Rip Squeak children's books and merchandise he and his wife, author Susan Yost-Filgate, created in 1997.

Biography

Early life and education
Leonard Filgate was born August 26, 1947, in San Francisco, California. At 16, he sold his first painting. After high school, he served in the United States Merchant Marine. In 1970, Filgate began a career as an artist and illustrator.

Career
Filgate is a self-taught artist and illustrator. Since 1970, he has created commissioned works for private individuals, projects for the US Navy, reproductions of Japanese screens, props for a Warner Bros. Television series, and theatrical backdrops. From 1997 to 2007, he created and illustrated Rip Squeak. Filgate has illustrated five children's books and two arts books, which have sold over 500,000 copies to date.

He has originals and prints are at the Delaware Art Museum in Wilmington, Delaware and the Good Samaritan Hospital in San Jose, California. He was the featured illustrator for the 2003 Los Angeles Times Festival of Books, has been included in the Simon Wiesenthal Museum of Tolerance "Every Picture Tells a Story" traveling exhibition, had a major solo exhibition in 2005/2006 at the Delaware Art Museum, and is an artist member of the Society of Illustrators in New York City.

Marriage and children
He married author Susan Yost in 1979; the couple have a daughter, born in 1984.

Notes

References
Delart
Every Picture
Sandra Leader, "The Magical World of a Carmel Couple," Central Coast Magazine (Summer 2002).
Pirate Tales and Beyond:  The Adventures of Rip Squeak & Friends, Joyce K. Schiller, © 2005 The Delaware Art Museum, Wilmington, Delaware
"An Interview with the Artist and Writer," San Luis Obispo New Times (December 2, 1999).
Sarah Seamark, "Rip Squeak:  The Mouse That Roars," Art World News (August 2001).
Lisa Crawford Watson, "Meet Rip Squeak and His Friends," Monterey Herald (December 11, 2001).

External links
The Fine Art and Illustration of Leonard Filgate
Rip Squeak

1947 births
Living people
American illustrators
Artists from San Francisco